Justin James Field (born 1899 in Down Hatherley) was an English clergyman and bishop for the Roman Catholic Diocese of Saint George's in Grenada. He was ordained in 1926. He was appointed bishop in 1957. He died in 1969.

References 

1899 births
1969 deaths
English Roman Catholic bishops
Roman Catholic bishops of Saint George's in Grenada